Coburg is a city (and a National Historic District) in Lane County, Oregon, United States,  north of Eugene. The city's population as of the 2020 census was 1,306.
Founded in 1847, Coburg has retained the characteristics of traditional small town with walkable and close ties to the surrounding farming communities that stretch in all directions. Maintaining these characteristics is the central part of the city's community vision process completed in 2017. (source: Travel Lane County and City of Coburg)

History 
The city was originally named Diamond after John Diamond, an early pioneer in the area, on whose land claim the city was located. The city's current name comes from a stallion that was named after the Coburg district of Bavaria, Germany, from whence the horse had been imported. The Coburg Historic District was placed on the National Register of Historic Places in 1986. The period of significance of the buildings in the district dates back to 1875. The City installed a sewer system in 2011 to 2015, leading to a new period of growth in both residential and commercial investment.

Economy 
Downtown is a national historic center that includes 30 buildings on the register.  Coburg is known for its attractive downtown, agricultural business connections, antique shops and annual antique fair. Beginning in 2018, Coburg will host the Pacific Northwest Marathon. (Source PNWM and City of Coburg) Several manufacturers are located along the I-5 corridor in Coburg.

Business
Coburg is headquarters for Marathon Coach Corporation, a manufacturer of luxury bus conversion motorcoaches. Marathon Coach has a manufacturing plant in Coburg, as well as plants in Grand Prairie, Texas, and San Antonio, Florida. Other businesses include APEL Extrusions.

Speed trap 
Until the practice was discontinued in 2005, Coburg's city government had generated hundreds of thousands of dollars for its budget through speeding fines at a speed trap on Interstate 5 located outside of city limits. By 2003, the city was raising nearly half of its $1.7 million annual budget through traffic fines. The speed trap was temporarily ended when Floyd Prozanski, a state legislator from Eugene, sponsored bills to make the practice against the law, effective January 2004. Police Chief Hudson also lost his job, following the adoption of the new law. However, the city annexed a segment of I-5, which enabled the continuation of some revenue from traffic fines to motorists in this area.

Geography 

Coburg is situated near the Coburg Hills.

Climate

This region experiences warm (but not hot) and semi-dry summers with some rainy days, with no average monthly temperatures above 70.4 °F.  According to the Köppen Climate Classification system, Coburg has a warm-summer Mediterranean climate, abbreviated "Csb" on climate maps.

There are cool winters during which intense rainfall occurs. It has warm, dry summers with moderate rainfall through the summer months.

Snow in Coburg is possible in winter months due to the higher latitude.

There are on annual average 152 days with measurable precipitation.

Demographics

2010 census
As of the census of 2010, there were 1,035 people, 398 households, and 283 families living in the city. The racial makeup of the city was 90.4% White, 0.4% African American, 0.8% Native American, 1.4% Asian, 0.6% Pacific Islander, 2.7% from other races, and 3.7% from two or more races. Hispanic or Latino of any race were 7.4% of the population.

There were 398 households, of which 33.7% had children under the age of 18 living with them, 59.0% were married couples living together, 8.3% had a female householder with no husband present, 3.8% had a male householder with no wife present, and 28.9% were non-families. 20.6% of all households were made up of individuals, and 5.8% had someone living alone who was 65 years of age or older. The average household size was 2.60 and the average family size was 3.00.

The median age in the city was 41.6 years. 23.1% of residents were under the age of 18; 8% were between the ages of 18 and 24; 24% were from 25 to 44; 34.7% were from 45 to 64; and 10% were 65 years of age or older. The gender makeup of the city was 49.3% male and 50.7% female.

2000 census
As of the census of 2000, there were 969 people, 367 households, and 256 families living in the city. The population density was 1,384.1 people per square mile (534.5/km). There were 387 housing units at an average density of 552.8 per square mile (213.5/km). The racial makeup of the city was 92.67% White, 1.96% Native American, 1.14% Asian, 0.31% Pacific Islander, 0.10% African American, 1.44% from other races, and 2.37% from two or more races. Hispanic or Latino of any race were 2.99% of the population. There were 367 households, out of which 36.5% had children under the age of 18 living with them, 59.1% were married couples living together, 8.7% had a female householder with no husband present, and 30.0% were non-families. 21.8% of all households were made up of individuals, and 6.3% had someone living alone who was 65 years of age or older. The average household size was 2.64 and the average family size was 3.07.

In the city, the population was 28.6% under the age of 18, 6.5% from 18 to 24, 28.8% from 25 to 44, 25.8% from 45 to 64, and 10.3% who were 65 years of age or older. The median age was 38 years. For every 100 females, there were 99.8 males. For every 100 females age 18 and over, there were 99.4 males. The median income for a household in the city was $47,500, and the median income for a family was $54,250. Males had a median income of $41,029 versus $26,071 for females. The per capita income for the city was $21,696. About 7.7% of families and 7.7% of the population were below the poverty line, including 4.5% of those under age 18 and 21.6% of those age 65 or over.

Notable person
Howie Fox, baseball player

References

External links 

 Entry for Coburg in the Oregon Blue Book

Cities in Oregon
Cities in Lane County, Oregon
1893 establishments in Oregon
Populated places established in 1893